Cracow Monsters is a Polish supernatural thriller television series created by Netflix and based on Polish mythology. The show is directed by Kasia Adamik and Olga Chajdas. It was written by Anna Sienska, Gaja Grzegorzewska, and Magdalena Lankosz. The series was released on 18 March 2022 on Netflix.

Synopsis
A young woman in Kraków with a mysterious past joins a team of medical students led by an enigmatic professor who solve supernatural mysteries.

Cast
 Barbara Liberek as Aleksandra "Alex" Walas 
 Andrzej Chyra as Professor Jan Zawadzki
 Małgorzata Bela  as Aitwar 
 Stanisław Linowski as Lucjan "Lucky" Szczesny 
 Mateusz Górski as Antoni 
 Anna Paliga as Iliana 
 Magdalena Kolesnik as Mary 
 Kaja Chan as Hania 
 Maja Chan as Basia 
 Wojciech Brzezinski as Robert 
 Daniel Namiotko as Gigi 
 Stanislaw Cywka as Birdy 
 Eryk Pratsko as Boy 
 Malgorzata Gorol as Jagna Walas 
 Julia Wyszynska as Ewa Zawadzka

Episodes

Reception
The Scotsman placed the series at number four on a list of top-ten TV shows and movies released in the third week of March 2022. GQ Mexico and Latin America described the show as a "perfect series" for people who enjoy watching horror TV shows.

References

External links
 
 

2022 Polish television series debuts
Polish drama television series
Mystery television series
Polish-language Netflix original programming
Television shows set in Poland